Tom "Kong" Watson (born 13 July 1982) is an English mixed martial artist currently competing in the welterweight division of Cage Warriors. A professional competitor since 2006, he is the former BAMMA Middleweight Champion, the former UCMMA Middleweight Champion, and has also competed for the UFC, Cage Rage and the MFC.

Background
Watson began training when he was 16 years old and has an extensive boxing background, winning two awards, Amateur Boxing Standout 2006, a three-time ABA Southern Counties Champion, and Full Contact Unlicensed Boxing Champion. Watson's nickname comes from his famous ring walks, featuring Watson wearing a gorilla mask.

Mixed martial arts career

Cage Rage and early career
Watson held a 1-0-1 amateur record before turning professional in 1991. He won his first two fights and was then given the chance to fight in the UK's top MMA promotion, Cage Rage. His first fight was against Daijiro Matsui in February 2007 at Cage Rage 20, and he lost via an armbar in the first round. He returned to the cage a month later and impressively defeated Dorlan O'Malley via KO after a slam.

After this, he was given another chance against a higher profile opponent. He took on UFC veteran Xavier Foupa-Pokam at CageRage 21: Judgement Day in April, 2007, but was submitted again. He fought a further two times that year, and recorded a win and a loss. In 2008, he began to climb the ladder again by beating Pierre Guillet and John Phillips, but Cage Rage went into liquidation and he then went to Ultimate Challenge MMA.

Ultimate Challenge MMA
Watson's first Ultimate Challenge MMA bout came against Daniel Cubitt at Ultimate Challenge UK: Bad Breed in December 2008. He won the fight by knocking his opponent out less than two minutes into the first round to win the inaugural Ultimate Challenge UK title. He returned at Ultimate Challenge UK: Dynamite in October 2009 to take on Denniston Sutherland, and defeated him via split decision.

Maximum Fighting Championship
On 10 January 2010, Watson signed a three-fight deal with the Maximum Fighting Championship, a Canadian promotion. His first fight was on 26 February 2010, where he took on Travis Galbraith on MFC 24: Heat XC. In the second minute of the first round, Kong knocked his opponent out with a vicious right head kick. This won him knockout of the night and put him at the top of the list for knockout of the year.

His second fight for the Canadian promotion took place on the main card of MFC 26 card against Jesse Taylor. Watson lost via unanimous decision (30-26, 30–26, 30-26) after being deducted a point for repeatedly grabbing the ropes.

BAMMA
On 27 June 2009, Watson fought at the British Association of Mixed Martial Arts' first event, BAMMA 1: The Fighting Premiership, after a hard-fought battle, Watson defeated John Maguire via TKO at 2:47 of round 3. It was confirmed that Maguire had broken his arm during the fight after a takedown.

He was then scheduled to fight Celebrity Big Brother winner Alex Reid for the vacant Middleweight Championship at BAMMA 3 in May 2010. However, Reid injured his knee while filming his documentary TV series Alex Reid: The Fight of His Life and was forced to pull out of the fight. This angered Watson, who claimed Reid was disrespecting him. Watson also called him a "clown" and said that it was likely Reid pulled out to avoid an embarrassing defeat. Reid was then replaced by UFC and IFL veteran Matt Horwich. After miraculously freeing himself from a rear-naked choke in the first round, Watson went on to dominate the fight with his superior striking and won via unanimous decision (48-47, 49–47, 49-46) to become the first BAMMA Middleweight Champion.

Initially, Watson maintained that he did not want to waste any more time training for and fighting such a low-level opponent as Reid but the Reid vs. Watson fight was rescheduled for BAMMA 4 on 25 September 2010. Watson won by unanimous decision, as the judges scored the fight 49-46 49-46 49–47.

On 21 May 2011, he faced former EliteXC Middleweight Champion Murilo Rua at Wembley Arena in London, England, defeating the PRIDE FC veteran by KO due to head kick followed up by punches in the third round, and defending his BAMMA Middleweight Title in the process.

Watson was set to fight former UFC Welterweight contender and current BAMMA Middleweight, Frank Trigg, for Kong's BAMMA Middleweight Championship. However, Tom has suffered a back injury and was replaced by Jim Wallhead.

Watson defended his title at BAMMA 9 against BAMMA British Middleweight Champion Jack Marshman, winning via TKO in the second round.

Ultimate Fighting Championship
After successfully defending his BAMMA Middleweight Championship title three times, Watson signed a contract with the UFC in July 2012.

In his debut, Watson fought Brad Tavares on 29 September 2012 at UFC on Fuel TV 5. He lost the fight via split decision.

Watson next faced undefeated Stanislav Nedkov on 16 February 2013 at UFC on Fuel TV: Barão vs. McDonald. He won the back-and-forth fight via TKO in the second round. Both participants earned Fight of the Night honors for their performance, while Watson also earned a Knockout of the Night bonus.

For his third fight with the promotion, Watson faced Thales Leites on 3 August 2013 at UFC 163. He lost the fight via unanimous decision.

Watson was expected to face Alessio Sakara on 26 October 2013 at UFC Fight Night: Machida vs. Munoz. However, he was forced out of the bout with an injury and was replaced by Magnus Cedenblad.

Watson fought Nick Catone on 1 February 2014 at UFC 169. He lost the fight via split decision.

Watson faced promotional newcomer Sam Alvey on 16 August 2014 at UFC Fight Night 47. He won the back-and-forth fight via unanimous decision.

Watson faced Rafael Natal on 31 January 2015 at UFC 183. He lost the fight by unanimous decision.

Watson faced Chris Camozzi on 8 August 2015 at UFC Fight Night 73.  He lost the fight by unanimous decision and was subsequently released from the promotion.

Return to BAMMA
On 25 July 2018 it was announced that after a three-year hiatus from fighting, Watson had signed a multi-fight contract with BAMMA. Due to complete lack of events in BAMMA, Watson was announced to have signed with Cage Warriors and will be moving down to welterweight division. Watson was expected to face Aaron Khalid at Cage Warriors 104, but on the fight day he was not medically cleared and was forced off the card.

Championships and accomplishments
BAMMA
BAMMA World Middleweight Championship (One Time)
Three successful title defenses
Fight of the Night (Five Times)
Knockout of the Night (Three Times)
Ultimate Fighting Championship
Fight of the Night (One Time)
Knockout of the Night (One Time)
Maximum Fighting Championship
Knockout of the Night (One Time)
Knockout of the Year 2010
Ultimate Challenge MMA
UCMMA World Middleweight Championship (One Time)
One successful title defense

Mixed martial arts record

|-
|Loss
|align=center|17–9
|Chris Camozzi
|Decision (unanimous)
|UFC Fight Night: Teixeira vs. Saint Preux
|
|align=center|3
|align=center|5:00
|Nashville, Tennessee, United States
|
|-
| Loss
| align=center| 17–8
| Rafael Natal
| Decision (unanimous)
| UFC 183
| 
| align=center| 3
| align=center| 5:00
| Las Vegas, Nevada, United States
| 
|-
| Win
| align=center| 17–7
| Sam Alvey
| Decision (unanimous)
| UFC Fight Night: Bader vs. St. Preux
| 
| align=center| 3
| align=center| 5:00
| Bangor, Maine, United States
| 
|-
| Loss
| align=center| 16–7
| Nick Catone
| Decision (split)
| UFC 169
| 
| align=center| 3
| align=center| 5:00
| Newark, New Jersey, United States
| 
|-
| Loss
| align=center| 16–6
| Thales Leites
| Decision (unanimous)
| UFC 163
| 
| align=center| 3
| align=center| 5:00
| Rio de Janeiro, Brazil
| 
|-
| Win
| align=center| 16–5
| Stanislav Nedkov
| TKO (knees and punches)
| UFC on Fuel TV: Barão vs. McDonald
| 
| align=center| 2
| align=center| 4:42
| London, England
| 
|-
| Loss
| align=center| 15–5
| Brad Tavares
| Decision (split)
| UFC on Fuel TV: Struve vs. Miocic
| 
| align=center| 3
| align=center| 5:00
| Nottingham, England
| 
|-
| Win
| align=center| 15–4
| Jack Marshman
| TKO (punches and elbows)
| BAMMA 9
| 
| align=center| 2
| align=center| 4:50
| Birmingham, England
| 
|-
| Win
| align=center| 14–4
| Murilo Rua
| KO (head kick and punches)
| BAMMA 6: Watson vs. Rua
| 
| align=center| 3
| align=center| 2:06
| London, England
| 
|-
| Win
| align=center| 13–4
| Alex Reid
| Decision (unanimous)
| BAMMA 4
| 
| align=center| 5
| align=center| 5:00 
| Birmingham, England
| 
|-
| Loss
| align=center| 12–4
| Jesse Taylor
| Decision (unanimous)
| MFC 26
| 
| align=center| 3
| align=center| 5:00
| Brandon, Manitoba, Canada
| 
|-
| Win
| align=center| 12–3
| Matt Horwich
| Decision (unanimous)
| BAMMA 3
| 
| align=center| 5
| align=center| 5:00
| Birmingham, England
| 
|-
| Win
| align=center| 11–3
| Travis Galbraith
| KO (head kick)
| MFC 24
| 
| align=center| 1
| align=center| 1:56
| Edmonton, Alberta, Canada
| 
|-
| Win
| align=center| 10–3
| Denniston Sutherland
| Decision (split)
| UCMMA 8: Dynamite
| 
| align=center| 3
| align=center| 5:00
| London, England
| 
|-
| Win
| align=center| 9–3
| John Maguire
| TKO (punches)
| BAMMA 1
| 
| align=center| 2
| align=center| 3:47
| London, England
| 
|-
| Win
| align=center| 8–3
| Daniel Cubitt
| TKO (punches)
| UCMMA 1: Bad Breed
| 
| align=center| 1
| align=center| 1:57
| London, England
| 
|-
| Win
| align=center| 7–3
| Lloyd Clarkson
| Decision (unanimous)
| Atlas Fighting Challenge
| 
| align=center| 3
| align=center| 5:00
| Coventry, England
|
|-
| Win
| align=center| 6–3
| John Phillips
| Decision (unanimous)
| Cage Rage 27
| 
| align=center| 3
| align=center| 5:00
| London, England
| 
|-
| Win
| align=center| 5–3
| Pierre Guillet
| KO (upkick)
| Cage Rage 25
| 
| align=center| 1
| align=center| 1:05
| London, England
| 
|-
| Loss
| align=center| 4–3
| Mark Epstein
| Decision (split)
| Cage Rage 24
| 
| align=center| 3
| align=center| 5:00
| London, England
| 
|-
| Win
| align=center| 4–2
| Ed Smith	
| Decision (unanimous)
| Cage Rage 22
| 
| align=center| 3
| align=center| 5:00
| London, England
| 
|-
| Loss
| align=center| 3–2
| Xavier Foupa-Pokam
| Submission (triangle kimura)
| Cage Rage 21
| 
| align=center| 2
| align=center| 2:27
| London, England
| 
|-
| Win
| align=center| 3–1
| Dorlan O'Malley
| KO (slam and punches)
| Cage Rage Contenders 4
| 
| align=center| 1
| align=center| 2:21
| London, England
| 
|-
| Loss
| align=center| 2–1
| Daijiro Matsui
| Submission (armbar)
| Cage Rage 20
| 
| align=center| 1
| align=center| 0:59
| London, England
| 
|-
| Win
| align=center| 2–0
| Tulio Palhares
| Decision
| ZT Fight Night 2
| 
| align=center| 3
| align=center| 5:00
| London, England 
| 
|-
| Win
| align=center| 1–0
| Michael Watson
| Submission (guillotine choke)
| ZT Fight Night 1
| 
| align=center| 1
| align=center| 1:11
| London, England
|

See also
 List of current UFC fighters
 List of male mixed martial artists

References

External links
 

 Top 5 Tom Watson Knockouts

1982 births
Living people
English male karateka
British savateurs
British wushu practitioners
English Wing Chun practitioners
Mixed martial artists utilizing Kyokushin kaikan
Mixed martial artists utilizing Lau Gar
Mixed martial artists utilizing Wing Chun
Mixed martial artists utilizing Muay Thai
Mixed martial artists utilizing savate
Mixed martial artists utilizing boxing
Mixed martial artists utilizing Brazilian jiu-jitsu
English male mixed martial artists
Middleweight mixed martial artists
English Muay Thai practitioners
English practitioners of Brazilian jiu-jitsu
English expatriates in Canada
Sportspeople from Southampton
Ultimate Fighting Championship male fighters